Anita Galić (born March 11, 1985 in Split) is a freestyle swimmer from Croatia, who made her Olympic debut for her native country at the 2004 Summer Olympics in Athens, Greece, competing in 400 meters and 800 meters freestyle.

Sources
Anita Galić at sports-reference.com

External links
 Short profile on the Croatian Swimming Federation

1985 births
Living people
Croatian female freestyle swimmers
Olympic swimmers of Croatia
Swimmers at the 2004 Summer Olympics
Sportspeople from Split, Croatia
Croatian female swimmers
21st-century Croatian women